In differential geometry, the second fundamental form (or shape tensor) is a quadratic form on the tangent plane of a smooth surface in the three-dimensional Euclidean space, usually denoted by  (read "two"). Together with the first fundamental form, it serves to define extrinsic invariants of the surface, its principal curvatures. More generally, such a quadratic form is defined for a smooth immersed submanifold in a Riemannian manifold.

Surface in R3

Motivation
First suppose that the surface is the graph of a twice continuously differentiable function, and that the plane  is tangent to the surface at the origin. Therefore, the Taylor expansion of f at (0,0) starts with quadratic terms:

 

and the second fundamental form at the origin in the coordinates  is the quadratic form

 

Classical notation
The second fundamental form of a general parametric surface is defined as follows. Equivalently, the cross product  is a nonzero vector normal to the surface. The parametrization thus defines a field of unit normal vectors :

The second fundamental form is usually written as

its matrix in the basis  of the tangent plane is

For a signed distance field of Hessian , the second fundamental form coefficients can be computed as follows:

Physicist's notation
The second fundamental form of a general parametric surface  is defined as follows.

Equivalently, the cross product  is a nonzero vector normal to the surface. The parametrization thus defines a field of unit normal vectors :

The second fundamental form is usually written as

The equation above uses the Einstein summation convention.
 

Hypersurface in a Riemannian manifold 

In Euclidean space, the second fundamental form is given by

where  is the Gauss map, and  the differential of  regarded as a vector-valued differential form, and the brackets denote the metric tensor of Euclidean space.

More generally, on a Riemannian manifold, the second fundamental form is an equivalent way to describe the shape operator (denoted by ) of a hypersurface,

where  denotes the covariant derivative of the ambient manifold and  a field of normal vectors on the hypersurface.  (If the affine connection is torsion-free, then the second fundamental form is symmetric.)

Generalization to arbitrary codimension 

The second fundamental form can be generalized to arbitrary codimension. In that case it is a quadratic form on the tangent space with values in the normal bundle and it can be defined by

where  denotes the orthogonal projection of covariant derivative  onto the normal bundle.

In Euclidean space, the curvature tensor of a submanifold can be described by the following formula:

This is called the Gauss equation, as it may be viewed as a generalization of Gauss's Theorema Egregium.

See also
First fundamental form
Gaussian curvature
Gauss–Codazzi equations
Shape operator
Third fundamental form
 Tautological one-form

References

External links
 Steven Verpoort (2008) Geometry of the Second Fundamental Form: Curvature Properties and Variational Aspects from Katholieke Universiteit Leuven.

Differential geometry
Differential geometry of surfaces
Riemannian geometry
Curvature (mathematics)
Tensors